A living medicine is a type of biologic that consists of a living organism that is used to treat a disease. This usually takes the form of a cell (animal, bacterial, or fungal) or a virus that has been genetically engineered to possess therapeutic properties that is injected into a patient. Perhaps the oldest use of a living medicine is the use of leeches for bloodletting, though living medicines have advanced tremendously since that time.

Examples of living medicines include cellular therapeutics (including immunotherapeutics), phage therapeutics, and bacterial therapeutics, a subset of the latter being probiotics.

Development of living medicines

Development of living medicines is an extremely active research area in the fields of synthetic biology and microbiology. Currently, there is a large focus on: 1) identifying microbes that naturally produce therapeutic effects (for example, probiotic bacteria), and 2) genetically programming organisms to produce therapeutic effects.

Applications

Cancer therapy

There is tremendous interest in using bacteria as a therapy to treat tumors. In particular, tumor-homing bacteria that thrive in hypoxic environments are particularly attractive for this purpose, as they will tend to migrate to, invade (through the leaky vasculature in the tumor microenvironment) and colonize tumors. This property tends to increase their residence time in the tumor, giving them longer to exert their therapeutic effects, in contrast to other bacteria that would be quickly cleared by the immune system.

References 

Bacteria and humans
Biological engineering
Biotechnology
Biotechnology products
Biopharmaceuticals
Pharmaceutical industry
Life sciences industry
Specialty drugs
Pharmacy